Hariyeh (also Romanized as Ḩarīyeh, Heriah, and Horrīyeh; also known as Ḩorrīyeh-ye Bozorg) is a village in Jarahi Rural District, in the Central District of Mahshahr County, Khuzestan Province, Iran. At the 2006 census, its population was 56, in 12 families.

References 

Populated places in Mahshahr County